Horst Franz Flosbach (born 18 June 1936) is a German long-distance runner. He competed in the men's 5000 metres at the 1960 Summer Olympics.

References

1936 births
Living people
Athletes (track and field) at the 1960 Summer Olympics
German male long-distance runners
Olympic athletes of the United Team of Germany
Place of birth missing (living people)